Aki Korhonen (born September 28, 1975) is a Finnish retired professional ice hockey winger.

Korhonen played a total of 264 games in the SM-liiga, playing for KalPa, Blues and SaiPa between 1996 and 2001.

References

External links

1975 births
Living people
Espoo Blues players
Finnish ice hockey right wingers
Iisalmen Peli-Karhut players
KalPa players
People from Savonlinna
SaiPa players
SaPKo players
Sportspeople from South Savo